Deep Water is a 2006 British documentary film directed by Jerry Rothwell and Louise Osmond, and produced by Al Morrow, Jonny Persey and John Smithson. It is based on the true story of Donald Crowhurst and the 1968 Sunday Times Golden Globe Race round the world alone in a yacht. The film reconstructs Crowhurst's voyage from his own audio tapes and cine film, interwoven with archival footage and interviews.

Production
Smithson had previously produced the successful British documentary, Touching the Void (2003).

Reception
The film received critical acclaim. The official poster quotes The Daily Telegraph, 'A movie which will reduce the hardest of hearts to a shipwreck'. Variety said "As it explore the limits of human endurance, the pic should suck even land-lubbers into a whirlpool of gripping adventure, overblown ambitions and sheer human folly". It was described as 'fascinating' by The New York Times upon its release.

The film won the Best Documentary award at the 2006 Rome International Film Festival and a commendation in the Australian Film Critics Association 2007 Film Awards.

The film opened in the UK on 15 December 2006 and grossed $122,384. It was released on 24 August 2007 in the United States where it grossed $271,143 and went on to gross $727,202 worldwide.

References

External links
Pathe International - Deep Water
British Film Council - Deep Water

BFI Collections - Deep Water (2006)
Deep Water site for Independent Lens on PBS 
 
 

British documentary films
Documentary films about water transport
2006 films
Films about water sports
2000s English-language films
2000s British films